Carlo Rezzonico may refer to:

Pope Clement XIII (Carlo della Torre di Rezzonico, 1693–1769)
Carlo Rezzonico (cardinal) (1724–1799), Clement XIII's nephew and Camerlengo of the Holy Roman Church